is a Japanese manga series by Shogo Sugitani (also known as Ningen Plamo), serialized online via pixiv Comic website since April 2017. It has been collected in six tankōbon volumes by Media Factory. A spin-off manga by Sugitani titled  has also been serialized online via pixiv Comic since July 2018. It has been collected in a single tankōbon volume by Media Factory. An anime film adaptation by CLAP premiered in Japan on June 4, 2021.

Characters

Media

Manga
Sugitani started releasing the manga on Pixiv in April 2017. In 2018, it was nominated for the Manga Taishō awards. Seven Seas Entertainment publishes the manga in North America.

Anime film
An anime adaptation was announced on August 26, 2017, later revealed to be an anime film on September 1, 2019.  The film is animated by CLAP and directed by Takayuki Hirao, with Ryoichiro Matsuo serving as producer and Shingo Adachi designing the characters.  Kenta Matsukuma is composing the film's music.  The film was set to premiere on March 19, 2021, after being delayed from 2020. However, it was delayed again to June 4, 2021, due to the COVID-19 pandemic. 

GKIDS acquired the rights to the film in North America, and have screened it in Japanese with English subtitles and an English dub from April 27–29, 2022. They released the film in digital format on June 28, 2022, and in a Blu-ray Disc/DVD combo on July 12.

The film was nominated for Best Animated Feature – Independent at the 49th Annie Awards.

References

External links
  
 
 

2021 anime films
Anime films based on manga
Anime postponed due to the COVID-19 pandemic
Comedy anime and manga
Fiction about filmmaking
Films postponed due to the COVID-19 pandemic
Japanese webcomics
Kadokawa Dwango franchises
Media Factory manga
Seven Seas Entertainment titles
Shōjo manga
Slice of life anime and manga
Webcomics in print